John P. Healy (born ) is a United States Air Force lieutenant general who serves as the chief of Air Force Reserve and commander of the Air Force Reserve Command since August 3, 2022. He served as the deputy to the chief of Air Force Reserve from July 2021 to August 2, 2022. He previously commanded the 22nd Air Force from 2019 to 2021.

References

External links

1967 births
Living people
United States Air Force generals
Year of birth uncertain